European Business School Paris (also known as EBS Paris) is a private business school located in Paris, France, part of INSEEC U.

History
Opened in 1967, EBS Paris has had a pioneering influence on the European model of education, being the first international business school founded in France. EBS Paris is an international institution with campuses in several cities (Paris, London, Geneva and San Francisco). It also has over 130 partner universities in 30 countries, such as London School of Economics, McGill University, University of California, San Diego and University of New South Wales.

EBS Paris is a European state-accredited school of management. Its flagship degree, a five-year program, is recognized by the French Ministry of Education as a Master's degree qualification, making it a Grande École.

EBS Paris is also a member of UGEI, Conférence des Grandes écoles, European Foundation for Management Development, and Association to Advance Collegiate Schools of Business.

It is currently still one of the few schools to educate international executives and business managers who master three languages, having over 7,600 alumni in 64 countries. EBS Paris is a partner of the French National Committee of Foreign Trade Advisers.

The school has been part of Laureate International Universities since 2013. Bill Clinton was the honorary chancellor of the network from 2010 to 2015.

EBS Paris has been ranked 92 in the top 100 universities in the world by the Ecole des Mines ParisTech in 2011. The ranking was made considering the number of alumni holding management positions in the world's 500 largest companies. It was ranked 29th-best "post-bac" business school by le figaro in 2018.

Notable alumni 
 Jacques-Antoine Granjon, French entrepreneur and CEO
 Arthur Sadoun, French businessman
 Laurent de Gourcuff, French businessman.

References

External links
 

Business schools in France
Educational institutions established in 1967